Fatimah Suwaed (born 3 March 2007) is an Iraqi Paralympic athlete. She made her maiden Paralympic appearance during the 2020 Summer Paralympics. Competing at the age of 14, she became the youngest ever athlete from Iraq to compete at the Paralympics.

Career 

She represented Iraq at the 2020 Summer Paralympics and competed in both women's 100m T35 and women's 200m T35 events.

References 

2007 births
Living people
Iraqi female sprinters
Cerebral Palsy category Paralympic competitors
Athletes (track and field) at the 2020 Summer Paralympics
Paralympic athletes of Iraq
Sportspeople from Baghdad